Blake Ellis and Tristan Schoolkate won the title after defeating Ajeet Rai and Yuta Shimizu 4–6, 7–5, [11–9] in the final.

This was the first edition of the tournament since 2013.

Seeds

Draw

References

External links
 Main draw

NSW Open - Men's doubles